Exoletuncus unguiculus is a species of moth of the family Tortricidae. It is found in Peru.

The wingspan is 23 mm. The ground colour of the forewings is reduced to yellowish-white lines extending from the dorsum to the costa. The hindwings are greyish cream in the posterior half, diffusely spotted brownish grey.

Etymology
The species name refers to the shape of the sacculus and is derived from Latin unguiculus (meaning a small claw).

References

Moths described in 2010
Euliini
Moths of South America
Taxa named by Józef Razowski